Clifford is a 1994 American slapstick black comedy film directed by Paul Flaherty, written by Jay Dee Rock and Steven Kampmann (under the alias of "Bobby Von Hayes"), and starring Martin Short, Charles Grodin, Mary Steenburgen, and Dabney Coleman with supporting roles done by G.D. Spradlin, Anne Jeffreys, Richard Kind, and Jennifer Savidge. It tells the story of a 10-year-old boy who stays with his uncle while his parents are on a business trip in Honolulu.

The film was shot in 1990 and originally planned for release in the summer of 1991, but it remained in limbo for several years due to Orion Pictures' bleak financial situation. It was not released until 1994, and it was a critical and commercial failure. Despite the negative reception, the film has gained a cult following over the years.

Plot
At a Catholic school in 2050, an old priest named Father Clifford catches a boy named Roger running away after blowing up the gym because he was not allowed on a basketball team. Clifford tells him a story of his own youth. As a 10-year-old, Clifford is an obnoxious and eccentric boy who never lets go of a toy dinosaur named Steffen and wants to visit Dinosaur World, a theme park in Los Angeles. While flying with his parents to Honolulu on his father Julian's business trip, Clifford intentionally causes the pilot to make an emergency landing in Los Angeles.

Father Clifford takes this moment to tell Roger about his father Julian's brother, Martin, a famous architect who is working for Gerald Ellis. Martin wants to marry his co-worker Sarah Davis, though Sarah wants to have kids with him. Because Clifford is now banned from the flight, Julian phones Martin to have Clifford temporarily stay with him in LA. Martin thinks that this is the perfect opportunity to prove to Sarah how well he interacts with children and is unaware of Clifford's antics. Upon their reunion, Martin reveals to Clifford that he designed Larry the Scary Rex, a Dinosaur World attraction, and can get into the park free of charge. Martin promises to take him there but has to break it the next day, as Ellis wants him to redesign LA's public transit system in two days. At a gas station, Clifford attempts to sneak away by posing as someone else's son in a dinosaur costume, but he's caught by Martin.

Enraged at Martin's broken promise, Clifford humiliates him during Sarah's parents' wedding anniversary with several pranks. Martin is arrested after Clifford calls in a fake bomb threat to city hall, made from mixing audio of Martin's scolding on an answering machine. Released on bail, Martin scolds Clifford again and wants him to write a confession to the police. Clifford later tricks Martin into catching a train to San Francisco, where Sarah has traveled on the request of Mr. Ellis attempting to seduce her. Back at Martin's home, Clifford throws a party in exchange for a trip to Dinosaur World. When Martin returns home, he boards Clifford up in his room; Sarah later frees Clifford and takes him with her. As Martin arrives late to Ellis's presentation of Martin's transit system, the city model, rigged by Clifford, explodes, costing Martin his job.

Martin kidnaps Clifford from Sarah's house and takes him to Dinosaur World after closing hours, and makes him ride Larry the Scary Rex. After going through it once, Clifford seems to enjoy himself, so Martin increases the ride's speed repeatedly. When set to hyper speed, the ride malfunctions and Clifford's cart crashes, leaving him dangling above the jaws of a robotic dinosaur. Martin rants about what Clifford's mischief has cost him, but he eventually risks his life and rescues Clifford. Clifford apologizes, but Martin won't hear it, and calls him a force of destruction that eventually everyone gets to hate.

Father Clifford tells Roger how he was devastated to hear those words, and how it forced him to see the error of his ways. He had sent 287 apology letters to Martin, which were returned unopened. When Roger asks about what happened to Sarah, Clifford reveals that she and Martin were married, and he was invited as the ring bearer. Through a gesture from Sarah, Martin finally forgives Clifford and gives him a kiss on the head. Moved by the tale, Roger decides to write 287 letters asking for forgiveness. Father Clifford takes Steffen out of his pocket, saying "Mission accomplished, old friend."

Cast

Production 
Co-writer Steven Kampmann had the idea of doing a comedy version of The Bad Seed (1956). The film was greenlit by Orion Pictures, but producer Larry Brezner was concerned that there was another comedy about an evil child coming out, Problem Child, and put a halt to production. To distinguish Clifford, Kampmann suggested the child lead be played by Martin Short, who was a fan of The Bad Seed. Kampmann and Short filmed screen tests with Short as Clifford, and Orion liked the footage. Kampmann was hired as director, but disagreements emerged between him and other members of the creative team, and Orion brought in Paul Flaherty to replace him.

Though shot in 1990, Cliffords release was delayed by the bankruptcy of Orion Pictures. The film was not released until April 1994, a year in which the highest-grossing comedies were The Mask and Dumb and Dumber, and enthusiasm for marketing it was low.

Critical reception 

The film was critically panned. On Rotten Tomatoes it holds a 13% approval rating based on 31 reviews. The site's critical consensus reads, "Ill-conceived and desperately unfunny, Clifford stars Martin Short as a 10-year-old boy. You read that correctly. That's the joke."

Roger Ebert gave the film a half-star of a possible four. He wrote: "The movie is so odd, it's almost worth seeing just because we'll never see anything like it again. I hope." He and his colleague Gene Siskel gave Clifford "Two thumbs down" on their television show At the Movies, with particular criticism towards Martin Short's casting; Siskel likened him to "a wizened little dwarf". Desson Thomson for The Washington Post praised Grodin but said everything else was "an awful piece of business"; Variety called it "gimmicky" and "poorly conceived".

Despite this broader negative reception, Clifford has since gained a reputation as a cult film. Martin Short later said, "I remember going to a critics' screening, sitting at the back, and the place was raucous. And yet the reviews did not reflect that. ... I think when a film is obscure enough, you feel it's now yours. Your parents don't know this film, but you do."

Year-end lists
 6th worst – Sean P. Means, The Salt Lake Tribune
 Top 10 worst (not ranked) – Betsy Pickle, Knoxville News-Sentinel
 Top 12 worst (Alphabetically ordered, not ranked) – David Elliott, The San Diego Union-Tribune
Dishonorable mention – Glenn Lovell, San Jose Mercury News

References

External links 
 
 
 

Orion Pictures films
1994 films
1990s black comedy films
Films set in 2050
Films set in Los Angeles
American black comedy films
Films scored by Richard Gibbs
Films with screenplays by Steven Kampmann
Films set in amusement parks
1994 comedy films
1990s English-language films
Films directed by Paul Flaherty
1990s American films